Nadiya yea is the first album from the Ukrainian ska-punk band Mad Heads XL after the former band Mad Heads was complemented with a three piece brass section. It was released in Ukraine and has had great success.

The album consists of several covers of Ukrainian folk songs and a cover of the song Don't Worry be happy by Bobby McFerrin.

Tracks from it, "Надія є" (Nadiya Yea), "Автобус Буратін" (Avtobus Buratin), "Пісня світла"(Pisnya Svitla) and "Смерека" (Smereka) appear on the Ukraine-released compilation album Naykrascha Myt.

Track listing
" Смерека" (Smereka) - 2:31
" Надія Є" (Nadiya Yea) - 2:35
" Дубки" (Dubky) - 3:17
" Пісня світла" (Pisnya Svitla) - 3:45
" Цигани" (Tsygany) - 2:25
" Гроші" (Groshi) - 3:37
" Річенька" (Richenka) - 4:14
" Спека Зимова" (Speka Zymova) - 3:45
" Gangster's Days" - 4:13
" Don't Worry"- 5:34
" Nadiya Yea" - 3:27
" Автобус буратін" (Autobus Buratin) - 4:28
" Younger" - 3:24
" Радіо Вавилон" (Radio Babylon) - 4:27
" Надія Є"(ремікс) (Nadiya Yea - remix)- 3:27

Video
Надія Є (Nadiya Yea) by  O. Mykhaylenko and Victor Priduvalov
Надія Є - ремікс (Nadiya Yea - remix)  O. Mykhaylenko and O. Kostromin
Смерека (Smereka) by Madtwins
Пісня світла (Pisnya Svitla) by D. Malkov
Автобус буратін (Autobus Buratin) by U. Morozov

Personnel
Vadym Krasnooky – vocal, guitars
Maxym Krasnooky – spacebass
Bogdan Ocheretyany – drums
Maxym Kochetov - saxophone
Vadym Nikitan - trumpet
Valeriy Chesnokov - trombone

Guests appearances
Anton "Burito" Buryko - trumpet (track 2)
Volodymyr Pushkar – trombone (track 2)
Serhiy Chehodayev - bass (track 10)
Serhiy Fomenko - vocals (track 5)
Victor Strannik - remix

References

2005 albums
Mad Heads XL albums